Olga Marta Sánchez Oviedo was a Costa Rican politician and Minister of Planning. She was Secretary General of the Citizens' Action Party (PAC for its Spanish initials).

She held a doctorate in economics from the National Autonomous University of Mexico and a Master's in social science from the Facultad Latinoamericana de Ciencias Sociales (Latin American Social Science College). In addition, she was a licenciate from the University of Costa Rica.

References

Living people
Members of the Legislative Assembly of Costa Rica
People from San José, Costa Rica
Citizens' Action Party (Costa Rica) politicians
21st-century Costa Rican women politicians
21st-century Costa Rican politicians
Year of birth missing (living people)